Wanda Zawidzka-Manteuffel (February 7, 1906 in Warsaw – May 4, 1994 in Warsaw) was a Polish graphic artist, author of book illustrations, posters, projects of glass, ceramics, and textures. She was member of the Koło Artystów Grafików Reklamowych.

Further reading

References
 

1906 births
1994 deaths
Artists from Warsaw
Polish graphic designers
Polish illustrators
Polish women illustrators
Polish poster artists
Polish women artists
Women graphic designers